Sven Stolpe (24 August 1905, in Stockholm – 26 August 1996, in Filipstad) was a Swedish writer, translator, journalist, literary scholar and critic. His brother was Herman Stolpe. Sven Stolpe was active in Swedish literary and intellectual discussion for most of his life. In the early 1930s, he argued for internationalism and argued against aestheticism, but he was also part of the Oxford Group which claimed the necessity of "moral and spiritual re-armament" and later in life, in 1947, he became a Catholic. Among his literary production is a dissertation on Queen Christina of Sweden, who abdicated as a result of her own conversion to Catholicism, which was published in 1959.

In 1984, the Belgian biographer Joris Taels published a biography of Stolpe.

He is buried in Vadstena cemetery.

Bibliography
Två generationer, Stockholm, 1929
I dödens väntrum, 1930
Livsdyrkare: studier i modern primitivism, Stockholm, 1931
 Together with Ernst Robert Curtius: Den franska kulturen : en orientering, Stockholm, 1932
Sigfrid Siwertz, Stockholm, 1933
Hjalmar Söderberg, Stockholm, 1934
Kristna falangen, 1934
Diktens frihet, Stockholm, 1935
Det svenska geniet och andra studier, Stockholm, 1935
Kristna falangen: franska essäer. Ny samling, 1936
Oxfordprofiler, Stockholm, 1938
I smältdegeln: Inlägg och skisser, 1941
Fem norrmän: Christopher Bruun, Eivind Berggrav, Arne Fjellbu, Ronald Fangen, Fredrik Ramm, Stockholm, 1942
General von Döbeln 1942 (screenplay)
 Imprisoned Women 1943 (screenplay)
En dag skall gry 1944 (screenplay)
 His Excellency 1944 (screenplay)
 We Need Each Other 1944 (screenplay)
 Crime and Punishment 1945 (screenplay)
Francois Mauriac och andra essayer, 1947
Lätt, snabb och öm, 1947
Änglar och demoner: karikatyrer och skisser, Stockholm, 1948
Den glömda vägen, Stockholm, 1949
Stefan George och andra studier, Stockholm, 1956
Ungdom, Uppsala, 1957
Student -23, Uppsala, 1958
Från stoicism till mystik: studier i drottning Kristinas maximer, Stockholm, 1959
Drottning Kristina, Stockholm, 1960-1961
Klara: komedi i fem akter, 1962
I dödens skugga 1962
Tre franska författare: essäer om André Gide, François Mauriac, Georges Bernanos, Stockholm, 1963
Dag Hammarskjölds andliga väg, Stockholm, 1964
Låt mig berätta, Stockholm, 1970
Låt mig berätta mer, minnen och anekdoter''',  Stockholm, 1971Svenska folkets litteraturhistoria, Stockholm, 1972Memoarer, Stockholm, 1974-1976Geijer : en essay, Stockholm, 1976
 Birgitta i Sverige och i Rom, StockholmTål ni höra mer? : minnen och anekdoter, Stockholm, 1976Olof Lagercrantz, Stockholm, 198040 svenska författare, Höganäs, 1980Livets löjen: glada minnen och bagateller, Stockholm, 1983Nikolaj Berdjajev, Borås, 1983Äventyr i Paris - och annorstädes : essayer av Sven Stolpe 1934-1974, Höganäs, 1984Mitt Värmland, Solna, 1985Jeanne d'Arc: en biografi, Höganäs, 1988Franciskus: lärjunge och diktare, Borås, 1988Tal till vänner, Borås, 1990

References

Further reading
Christoffersson, Birger. 1956. Sven Stolpe och den litterära debatten''. Stockholm: Bonnier. 

1905 births
1996 deaths
Writers from Stockholm
Converts to Roman Catholicism
Swedish Roman Catholics
Swedish-language writers
Swedish male writers
Swedish translators
Swedish literary scholars
Swedish critics
20th-century translators
Knights of Malta
20th-century male writers
20th-century Swedish journalists